Northwest Gbaya is a Gbaya language spoken across a broad expanse of Cameroon and the Central African Republic. The principal variety is Kara (Kàrà, Gbaya Kara), a name shared with several neighboring languages; Lay (Làì) is restricted to a small area north of Mbodomo, with a third between it and Toongo that is not named in Moñino (2010), but is influenced by the Gbaya languages to the south.

For male initiation rites, the Gbaya Kara use a language called La'bi.

Phonology
The following information is based on the 'Bodoe (Kàrà) and northern dialects:

Consonants 

 The labio-dental flap /ⱱ/ appears only in ideophonic adverbs within word-initial or intervocalic position.

Vowels 

 /w/ can be heard as centralized [ẅ] when preceding front vowels /i, e, ɛ/.

 /w/ is heard as nasalized [w̃] when preceding nasal vowels.

Writing system 
Paulette Roulon-Doko uses a uses a phonetic transcription in her works on Northwest Gbaya. The nasal vowels are noted there with the tilde under the vowel letter .

In Cameroon, an alphabet based on the General Alphabet of Cameroonian Languages is used, notably in the translation of the Bible into Gbaya published by the Alliance biblique du Cameroun. The nasal vowels are noted there with the cedilla under the vowel letter .

References

Gbaya languages
Languages of Cameroon
Languages of the Central African Republic